The Composite Helicopters International KC 518 Adventourer is a composite fuselage, 5-6 place turbine kit helicopter.

Design
The KC 518 is a composite fuselage helicopter kit for amateur construction. The airframe uses a carbon fiber and kevlar composite fuselage with a shrouded tail rotor. An auxiliary fuel system can be installed.

Variants
Other versions with the same fuselage are KC630 with Rolls-Royce RR300 engine in 2017 (priced at US$970,000), KC640 with the RR250 in 2018, and KC650 with the Honeywell LTS101, expected to be certified by 2019. The rights to the KC630 were acquired by Innova Helicopters in 2017.

Specifications (KC 518 Adventourer)

Test Flight Crashes
At about 11:15am on 7 May 2013, while on a test flight Pilot Peter Maloney and his female passenger were rescued uninjured after ditching in the Hauraki Gulf, New Zealand.

At about 9:30am on 8 November 2014, while on a test flight Pilot Peter Maloney and his co-pilot, Norbert Idelon were uninjured after a heavy landing near Silverdale, Auckland due to suspected mechanical problems.

See also

References

External links
Youtube Interview
Composite Helicopters International Ltd Website

KC 518
Single-turbine helicopters
Homebuilt aircraft
2010s New Zealand helicopters
Aircraft first flown in 2012